Neil Thompson (born 2 October 1963) is an English former professional footballer who played as a defender. He played for Scarborough, Ipswich Town and Barnsley amongst others.

Playing career
Thompson was born in Beverley, East Riding of Yorkshire. Whilst at Barnsley he played in the 1997–98 Premier League with the South Yorkshire club, appearing in three matches as a starter.

Coaching career
Thompson subsequently became a football coach and had spells at York City, Scarborough and Boston United as player-manager. He also worked for Leeds United Reserves team. Following the termination of Tony Pulis as Sheffield Wednesday manager, he would take on the role of caretaker manager on 28 December 2020 which would last for thirteen games until 1 March 2021, when Darren Moore was appointed permanent manager. On 13 January 2022, Thompson would take on the roll of manager for Wednesday's U23 side, following Lee Bullen taking the managers job at Ayr United.

Managerial statistics

Honours
Scarborough
 Football Conference: 1986–87

Ipswich Town
 Football League Second Division: 1991–92

Individual
 Scarborough Player of the Year: 1985–86
 PFA Team of the Year: 1988–89 Fourth Division

References

External links
 

1963 births
Living people
Sportspeople from Beverley
Footballers from the East Riding of Yorkshire
English footballers
Association football defenders
Nottingham Forest F.C. players
Hull City A.F.C. players
Scarborough F.C. players
Ipswich Town F.C. players
Barnsley F.C. players
Oldham Athletic A.F.C. players
York City F.C. players
Boston United F.C. players
Premier League players
English Football League players
National League (English football) players
English football managers
York City F.C. managers
Scarborough F.C. managers
Boston United F.C. managers
Sheffield Wednesday F.C. managers
English Football League managers
Sheffield Wednesday F.C. non-playing staff
Leeds United F.C. non-playing staff